Robert Alexander Courts (born 21 October 1978) is a British politician and barrister who served as the Parliamentary Under-Secretary of State for Transport from 2020 to 2022. A member of the Conservative Party, he has been  Member of Parliament (MP) for Witney since 2016.

Courts was elected for Witney at a by-election in 2016, succeeding former Prime Minister David Cameron. He retained his seat in the 2017 and 2019 general elections. Courts was Parliamentary Private Secretary to the secretary of state for environment, food and rural affairs from 2019 to 2020.

Early life and career
His father Ian Courts is a solicitor, company director, and the Conservative leader of Solihull Metropolitan Borough Council. His mother, Sheila, is a school governor.

Courts was schooled at Berkhamsted School, where he was head of Fry's House, before reading law at the University of Sheffield. Courts was called to the Bar at Lincoln's Inn in 2003 and practises as a barrister at 3PB Chambers principally in the fields of personal injury/clinical negligence and public and regulatory law, especially Animal Welfare, Aviation, Police and Proceeds of Crime Law. He worked in Wellington, New Zealand, at the Crown Law Office (Legal Advisors) for the New Zealand Government in 2009.

Political career
Courts stood as a Council candidate in Solihull in 2002 but was unsuccessful. Courts was elected a Conservative member of West Oxfordshire District Council in 2014. 

Courts supported the successful 'Leave' campaign in the EU referendum on 23 June 2016. He was selected as the Conservative Party candidate to replace David Cameron—who had resigned as Prime Minister of the United Kingdom in July and from Parliament in September—as MP in the 2016 Witney by-election.  Courts retained the seat for the Conservatives in the 20 October 2016 by-election, but his majority of 5,702 was considerably smaller than the 25,155-strong majority Cameron won in the 2015 general election. He was sworn into the House on 24 October. He is a member of the eurosceptic European Research Group, having subscribed in April 2017. 

Courts increased his majority to over 21,000 in the 2017 general election. He was appointed Parliamentary Private Secretary (PPS) for the Foreign and Commonwealth Office in January 2018, but resigned as a PPS on 15 July 2018, in protest of the White Paper on Exiting the European Union and the Chequers Agreement.  Courts was a supporter of the proposed free trade deal with Australia and New Zealand, describing it as a "no-brainer".

Courts' main Parliamentary interests are defence and foreign policy. He is credited by the House of Commons library with helping to lead the "parliamentary pressure" that led to the announcement of the Ministry of Defence's Combat Air Strategy, the programme for the eventual replacement of the Eurofighter Typhoon. Courts represents RAF Brize Norton, the largest RAF base in the UK, and serves as the vice chair of the All-Party Parliamentary Group for the Armed Forces.  Courts is not listed as having any military experience. Courts is a council member of the Air League.

In October 2018, the Parliamentary commissioner for standards found Courts had breached rules by using official stationery in campaign updates. Courts was elected to the Transport Committee in October 2018.

Courts was a member of the Justice Select Committee between January and December 2019.

In August 2019, Courts was appointed Parliamentary Private Secretary to the secretary of state for environment, food and rural affairs, Theresa Villiers. Regarding parliamentary procedure, Courts has been an outspoken critic of Early Day Motions (EDMs), describing them as "parliamentary graffiti". Courts has said that EDMs are generally tabled by MPs on behalf of "lobbyists or groups keen to show themselves as doing something", that they are "politically impotent" and a waste of taxpayers' money.

Under-Secretary of State for Transport

Courts was appointed Parliamentary Under-Secretary of State for Transport on 8 September 2020. His responsibilities include aviation and maritime affairs. In February 2022, he gave the keynote speech at the UK Chamber of Shipping annual dinner, urging for investment in sustainable shipping and a review to gather information related to shore power in ports. Courts is a supporter of High Speed 2 (HS2).

In June 2022, Courts was held partly accountable for the aviation travel crisis in UK airports. However, he was subsequently involved in significant discussions with Grant Shapps and senior aviation leaders to discuss the crisis.

On 21 September 2022, Coutts was formally replaced by Anne-Marie Trevelyan who, along with acting as Secretary of State for Transport, also assumed responsibility for shipping and aviation.

Personal life
Courts is married to Kathryn; they have two young children, and live in the village of Bladon, Oxfordshire. 

He has been a member of the Churchill Centre for many years, and reviews books about Winston Churchill in the quarterly journal, Finest Hour.

Notes

References

External links
Robert Courts official website
Robert Courts MP Maiden Speech, 2016

1978 births
Living people
Conservative Party (UK) MPs for English constituencies
Members of Lincoln's Inn
20th-century English lawyers
UK MPs 2015–2017
UK MPs 2017–2019
British barristers
People educated at Berkhamsted School
UK MPs 2019–present
Alumni of the University of Sheffield
Conservative Party (UK) councillors
Councillors in Oxfordshire
British Eurosceptics